Ženski košarkaški klub Šibenik, commonly referred to as ŽKK Šibenik or simply Šibenik, is a professional women's basketball club based in Šibenik, Croatia. It regularly competes in and has won the national championship, Premijer liga, five times, last time in 2008, and is considered to be among the leading women's basketball clubs in the country.

Home arena
Since 1973, ŽKK Šibenik plays its home matches in the Baldekin Sports Hall, which has a capacity of 900 or 1,726 if needed.

Honours

Domestic
National Championships – 5

 Yugoslav Women's Basketball League
Winners (1): 1990–91
Runners-up (3): 1987–88, 1988–89, 1989–90
 Croatian Women's Basketball League:
Winners (4): 1996–97, 2002–03, 2006–07, 2007–08
Runners-up (8): 1997–98, 2003–04, 2004–05, 2005–06, 2008–09, 2009–10, 2010–11, 2011–12

National Cups – 6

Yugoslav Women's Basketball Cup:
Winners (2): 1986–87, 1989–90
Ružica Meglaj-Rimac Cup:
Winners (4): 2001–02, 2003–04, 2005–06, 2007–08
Runners-up (8): 1996–97, 1997–98, 2000–01, 2002–03, 2006–07, 2009–10, 2010–11, 2012–13

National Super Cups – 1

Croatian Women's Basketball Super Cup:
Winners (1): 2007

International
International titles – 9

 Adriatic League:
Winners (5): 2004–05, 2005–06, 2007–08, 2008–09, 2010–11
Runners-up (5): 2001–02, 2002–03, 2003–04, 2006–07, 2009–10
 Vojko Herksel Cup
Winners (4): 2006, 2007, 2009, 2010
Runners-up (1): 2008

Players

Current roster

Depth chart

Notable players
Vanda Baranović-Urukalo
Marta Čakić
Luca Ivanković
Anđa Jelavić
Neda Lokas
Sandra Mandir
Antonija Mišura
Danira Nakić
Tina Periša
Emanuela Salopek
Simona Šoda

Notable coaches
Nenad Amanović 
Dražen Brajković
Stipe Bralić
Danko Radić
Neven Spahija

See also
 GKK Šibenka
 KK Jolly Jadranska Banka Šibenik
 Baldekin Sports Hall

References

External links
 Official website
 Profile at eurobasket.com

Sport in Šibenik
Women's basketball teams in Croatia
Women's basketball teams in Yugoslavia
Basketball teams established in 1971